Raptorapax is an extinct genus of rhachiberothid which existed in what is now Lebanon during the early Cretaceous period. It was named by Julian F. Petrulevicius, Dany Azar and André Nel in 2010, and the type species is Raptorapax terribilissima. It was found in Lebanese amber.

References 

Mantispoidea
Fossil taxa described in 2010
Cretaceous insects of Asia
Prehistoric insect genera